The 2002 Sure for Men Rockingham 500 was a Championship Auto Racing Teams (CART) motor race held on 14 September 2002 at the Rockingham Motor Speedway in Corby, Northamptonshire, England in front of an estimated crowd of 38,000 people. It was the 15th round of the 2002 CART season, the second Rockingham 500, and the only race of the year to be held in Europe. Team Green driver Dario Franchitti won the 211-lap race starting from fifth position. Cristiano da Matta finished second for Newman/Haas Racing, and Forsythe Racing's Patrick Carpentier was third.

Kenny Bräck won the pole position and maintained his advantage heading into the first lap. He led for a total of 134 laps, more than any other competitor. Franchitti employed a strategy that enabled him to drive in clean air while other drivers made pit stops. Bräck reclaimed the lead for the lap-163 restart, but lost it six laps later when a crew member dropped a wheel nut, which cost him time. Franchitti took the lead and held it for the remainder of the event to achieve his third victory of the season, his first on an oval track, and the tenth of his CART career. There were five cautions and nine lead changes during the course of the race.

The result put da Matta 58 points ahead of Bruno Junqueira in the Drivers' Championship. Franchitti maintained third place but was closer to Junqueira, with Carpentier and Christian Fittipaldi fourth and fifth. Toyota extended their advantage over Honda in the Manufacturers' Championship while Ford Cosworth remained in third, with four races left in the season. The race attracted 60 million worldwide television viewers. It was the final United Kingdom CART race to be held at Rockingham Motor Speedway as it moved to Brands Hatch, Kent in 2003.

Background

The Sure for Men Rockingham 500 was confirmed as part of CART's 2002 schedule in November 2001. It was the 15th of 19 scheduled races by CART, and was held on 14 September at the Rockingham Motor Speedway in Corby, Northamptonshire, England. It was the second consecutive year the race was held at Rockingham, and the only event of 2002 to be held in Europe. It was expected that the race would be attended by 52,000 people, the track's maximum capacity. The track is a four-turn  oval that has banking of up to 7.9 degrees. Before the race, Newman/Haas Racing driver Cristiano da Matta led the Drivers' Championship with 175 points, ahead of Bruno Junqueira in second, and Dario Franchitti in third. Patrick Carpentier was fourth on 101 points, and Christian Fittipaldi was a further three points behind in fifth. Toyota led the Manufacturers' Championship with 248 points, Honda were second on 214 points, and Ford Cosworth were in third on 178.

Following the cancellation of the German 500 at EuroSpeedway Lausitz due to financial difficulties, it was announced that the race at Rockingham was going ahead as scheduled. David Grace, the track's chief executive, invited German CART fans to attend the Rockingham 500. Franchitti, considered by the media to be the pre-race favourite, said a victory at Rockingham would be the highlight of his season and that he wanted to entertain the spectators. Having finished second in the 2001 race, Kenny Bräck stated his belief he could continue his good run of results in Europe and wanted competitive racing. Da Matta said his team had made a large number of adjustments to his car's setup on ovals and hoped his vehicle would be better than it was in Motegi. He spoke of his belief the race was important and wanted to finish in the first three. Carpentier said although he was disappointed with his 2001 result at the track, he was convinced he could improve his performance.

One driver made his début at the race. Dale Coyne Racing was formed in what was described as an "all-England" team named Team St. George for a one-race deal with British American Racing Formula One test driver and ASCAR Days of Thunder series competitor Darren Manning. He performed  of shakedown running which included a mandatory  test for rookie drivers observed by former CART driver Nicolas Minassian. Manning said of the decision to drive the team's No. 10 car: "It's something special, a dream come true. To drive a Champ Car is a dream in itself, it's really got some horsepower. But the special thing here is to be a part of Team St. George." He commented he wanted to impress other teams but admitted to having a disadvantage in that he had not competed in the series beforehand.

Grace said they had more knowledge of how the track behaved and expected the race to run more smoothly. He noted that people expected more in its second year. Rockingham Motor Speedway's facilities underwent improvements which included the addition of access roads and signage for visiting spectators.

Practice and qualifying
A single 135-minute practice session on Friday morning preceded Saturday's afternoon race. Alex Tagliani was fastest in the session, which took place in dry, warm weather, with a lap of 24.811 seconds; Tora Takagi, da Matta, Franchitti and Carpentier were in second through fifth. Seven yellow caution flags were shown: the first two were for track inspections, the next two were for debris located in turns three and four. The fifth caution was for Shinji Nakano who stopped at the bottom of turns three and four with smoke bellowing from his engine and dropped oil on the track that was cleaned. The sixth was caused by Michel Jourdain Jr. whose engine failed and stopped between turns three and four; his car was extricated from the circuit. The last was for Scott Dixon who slowed with a loss of engine power on the backstretch.
 Friday afternoon's 90-minute qualifying session permitted one car on the track in reverse order of the fastest combined practice laps. Each driver ran two laps, with the starting order determined by their fastest times. The session took place in dry and sunny weather. Bräck set the track speed record at Rockingham Motor Speedway to secure his first pole position of the season, the seventh of his CART career, and his second at the circuit, with a time of 24.908 seconds. He was joined on the grid's front row by Michael Andretti who was two-hundredths of a second slower. Da Matta qualified third. He removed his foot from the accelerator pedal driving through the fourth turn. Takagi took fourth, and Franchitti started fifth after steering right to the outside on his second lap due to an oversteer that slowed him. Junqueira's car was set up with a large amount of downforce and qualified in sixth. Paul Tracy secured seventh after sliding in the third and fourth turns. Tony Kanaan went into a back-up car and qualified eighth.

Forsythe Racing teammates Tagliani and Carpentier were ninth and tenth; an electrical problem overheated Carpentier's engine and he was unable to go faster when his blowoff valve opened between the first and second turns. Adrián Fernández was the fastest driver not to qualify in the top ten; his best lap time was more than two-tenths of a second slower than Bräck. A large amount of oversteer slowed Fittipaldi in turn four and he took 12th. Jimmy Vasser and Oriol Servià took 13th and 14th positions; Servià's car had oversteer after his first timed lap and entered the pit lane for car adjustments to make him faster on his second attempt. Nakano, 15th, had a plethora of understeer which slowed him in turn four. Dixon moved from his back-up car to his primary vehicle for qualifying and took 16th. Manning, 17th, worked on his race setup though gearbox issues before qualifying prevented his team from focusing on a qualifying tune. Mario Domínguez and Jourdain completed the qualifiers; Jourdain slowed through the third and fourth turns after an oversteer though his reduced speed prevented him from spinning.

Qualifying classification

Warm-up
The drivers took to the track at 09:30 British Summer Time (UTC+01:00) for a 30-minute warm-up session in cloudy weather. Andretti continued his strong form by recording the session's fastest lap of 25.205 seconds. Takagi continued to drive quickly and was second-fastest ahead of Carpentier. After the session ended, Franchitti said he felt the race's first laps would be treacherous as the ASCAR support race laid rubber that made the track slippery. He stated his belief that most of the overtaking would occur in the pit lane.

Race

An estimated 30,000 people attended the event. CART set the mandatory pit stop window to a maximum of 47 laps, requiring every driver to make at least four pit stops. Grace commanded the drivers to start their engines. The race began at 1:36 p.m. local time. Bräck maintained the lead into the first turn. Tagliani drove alongside his teammate Carpentier and overtook him for ninth place. Serviá moved from 14th to tenth by the end of the first lap, but fell to eleventh when another car passed him. He returned to tenth soon after. Junqueira was passed by Tagliani for seventh on lap three. After starting from 12th, Fittipaldi dropped to the rear of the field and was slower than the leading drivers. Tracy slowed without warning on lap 13 in the second turn with a power steering issue, and the first caution of the race was displayed two laps later when he stopped under the white line on the back straight with a gearbox problem requiring course officials to remove his car from the track. His engine's telemetry stopped working indicating a crank sensor failure, possibly caused by his gearbox problem.

Some drivers elected to make pit stops under caution. Fittipaldi had his engine control unit and spark box changed on lap 17 after he reported a problem with his car. Bräck remained the leader at the lap-21 restart and pulled away from the rest of the field. Andretti began to reduce the gap between Bräck and himself between laps 31 and 33. Tagliani reduced his pace between the second and third turns on lap 42, and was ordered by his engineer to enter the pit lane. His crew removed his car's left sidepod and retired on the next lap with a battery problem. A second caution was necessitated on the 46th lap when debris was located in turn two. The leaders made their pit stops because of the mandatory pit stop window. Fittipaldi's car problem re-emerged on the 44th lap despite having his vehicle's coils and springs changed; he drove to the pit lane to retire because his team's mechanics could not rectify the issue. Franchitti stalled his car because of a clutch issue. Bräck maintained the lead at the lap-52 restart, followed by Takagi. Nine laps later, Takagi attempted to overtake Bräck on the outside for the lead but was unsuccessful due to the presence of slower cars.

Nakano lost grip in the front of his vehicle and went straight into the turn four wall on the same lap. He heavily damaged his car's right-hand side prompting a third caution. Nakano slid through the infield and stopped unhurt on the frontstretch. Bräck led the field back up to speed at the lap-70 restart, with Takagi in second. Green-flag pit stops began on lap 94, with Bräck stopping on the same lap and Franchitti became the leader. It was part of Franchitti's strategy, devised by his team manager Kyle Moyer, to drive in clean air. Andretti was required to serve a stop-and-go penalty, which he took on the 103rd lap, after he was observed speeding in the pit lane. Franchitti made his pit stop four laps later and Manning took the lead. Manning made his pit stop on lap 114 and Bräck reclaimed the lead. After starting from 16th, Dixon was running in sixth by the 126th lap. He served two stop-and-go penalties because he was twice observed exceeding the pit lane speed limit, while Domínguez was similarly penalised.

The third round of green-flag pit stops commenced fifteen laps later when Bräck became the first driver to stop. Franchitti inherited the lead until he made his pit stop on lap 143, handing it to Manning. This meant Manning became the first driver to lead on his début CART race twice. The fourth caution was necessitated on the 155th lap when Manning's right-hand rear wing endplate detached and landed on the track between the first and second turns. Manning made a pit stop but his crew elected not to repair his rear wing. It assisted in making his car develop less understeer and slightly improved its balance. Racing resumed on lap 163 with Bräck leading a single-file restart. The left side of Kanaan's car collided heavily with the wall on the backstraight six laps later, triggering the fifth (and final) caution. All drivers including Bräck made pit stops under caution. A crew member on Bräck's team dropped a left-rear wheel nut dropping him to ninth. Fernández was observed speeding and was required to move to the rear of the field. Da Matta's team were slow to fit his right-rear tyre preventing him from taking the first position and he emerged in second.

Franchitti gained the lead and held it at the lap-180 restart. Junqueira attempted to pass Servià on the inside for fourth but was unsuccessful. Carpentier attempted to pressure da Matta towards the end but found it difficult to overtake and he did not want to be aggressive by going off the racing line. Vasser set the race's fastest lap during the 210th (and penultimate) lap, competing a circuit of 25.217 seconds. Franchitti maintained the lead for the remainder of the race and crossed the start-finish line after 211 laps to take his third victory of the season, his first win on an oval track in CART, and the tenth of his career. Da Matta was second, ahead of Carpentier in third, Servià was fourth and Junqueira fifth. Takagi, Vasser, Bräck, Manning, and Andretti rounded out the top ten finishers. Jourdain, Dixon, and Domínguez were the final classified finishers. There were nine lead changes in the race; four drivers reached the front of the field. Bräck's total of 134 laps led was the highest of any competitor. Franchitti led three times, for a total of 58 laps.

Post-race

The top three drivers appeared on the podium to collect their trophies and spoke to the media at a press conference. Franchitti was happy with the victory, saying that he did not believe that it would be different to win at the track but that it was "very, very special". He said that after his first pit stop he did not think that he would be able to win the race. Da Matta stated that he was worried about his advantage in the points standings and felt he had the car to win the event. He added that he could not relax because other drivers still had a mathematical chance of clinching the championship, though he was pleased with the result. Third-place finisher Carpentier said he was happy with his position and that it was a good day for his team. He revealed that changes made to his aerodynamic setup worked on the rolling restarts although it slowed him on the backstraight. Franchitti's race engineer Allen McDonald praised his driver, saying his first victory on an oval track was one that he would remember and that it was an "unbelievable day".

Manning said while his ninth-place result in his début race was one his team felt was a "fantastic result", he spoke of his disappointment that he was unable to get practice runs before qualifying as he felt that he could have started in a higher position. Bräck stated that he lost the chance of victory when a crew member dropped a wheel nut on his final pit stop, saying: "There is something hanging over us. I do my part, they do their part. When everyone is having a good day you win. If not, you lose." Fernández was angry with the pit lane speeding penalty, saying he felt he could have achieved a better finishing position and that the rule on pit lane speeding could "ruin your day". After the race, he spent several hours discussing the penalty with race officials. John Lopes, the CART Vice President of Racing Operations, later stated that the series would investigate the rules regarding pit lane speeding penalties but affirmed that no action could be taken until after the season's end.

Rick Broadbent, writing in The Times, said that due to his victory, Franchitti should have become "a household name" and felt that his future career prospects would be unhindered. Mike Nicks in The Observer called Franchitti's win "the greatest of his career", while Jim McGill of Scotland on Sunday noted that while Formula One was promoted as the fastest and most glamorous motorsport, he wrote of his feeling that Franchitti's victory allowed CART to showcase its more "dramatic" action. Grace remarked on the possible implications of Franchitti's success on the promotion of CART in the United Kingdom, "If that doesn't sell this sport to Britain then I don't know what will." The Stamford Mercury & Citizen said the sound of the cars at the circuit was "one of those sporting moments which stand up the hairs on the back of your head."

The result increased da Matta's advantage over Junqueira in the Drivers' Championship by five points. Franchitti remained in third place but decreased his deficit to sit seven points behind Junqueira. Carpentier kept fourth place with 115 points, and Fittipaldi remained in fifth on 98 points. Toyota extended their lead over Honda in the Manufacturers' Championship to be 32 points ahead. Ford Cosworth maintained third position on 192 points, with four races left in the season. Highlights of the event were shown the day after in the United Kingdom on the BBC Two sports programme Sunday Grandstand with commentary provided by former racing drivers Johnny Herbert and Charlie Cox. A total of 60 million television viewers in 190 countries watched the race. The event was the last to be held at the Rockingham Motor Speedway as it was announced in December 2002 that the United Kingdom race would be moved to Brands Hatch, Kent.

Race classification

Standings after the race

 Note: Only the top five positions are included for the drivers' standings.

References

Rockingham
Sure for Men